The Catlin Gabel School is an independent preschool through 12th grade institution located on 67 acres in Portland, Oregon 5 miles west of downtown. Annual enrollment is approximately 780 students from a wide variety of cultures, backgrounds, and financial abilities across the Portland metro area. The school's educational philosophy is founded on the four principles of progressive education (inquiry based, educating for democracy, teaching the whole child, and experiential learning).

History
With roots that go back to 1859, the school was formed by the 1957 merger between the Catlin Hillside School (founded in 1911 as Miss Catlin's School, named after the founder Ruth Catlin) and the Gabel Country Day School (originating as the Portland Academy, named after founder Priscilla Gabel). The school had initially hoped to expand onto the Gabel school property, but lost it to eminent domain. Since the Catlin property was too small to support the school, Catlin Gabel purchased the Honey Hollow Farm in 1958, relocating the Upper School there in the fall.  Nine years later, the Middle School relocated there, followed by the Lower School a year later, in 1968.  The school sold the Catlin Hillside buildings to the Portland Art Museum for its art school. The buildings were later converted to a community center for the Hillside neighborhood.

Catlin Gabel received a $3.8 million bequest from Howard Vollum (co-founder of Tektronix) in the late 1980s, growing the non-profit school's endowment. In 2005, the Malone Family Foundation endowed Catlin Gabel with a $2 million grant for financial aid under its Malone Scholars Program.

Students
As of the 2020-2021 school year, there were 780 students. The student body is divided into three groups: Upper School (grades 9–12), Middle School (grades 6–8), and Beginning and Lower School (preschool–grade 5).

In each of the last four years, (2017-20), a Catlin Gabel student has been named a U.S. Presidential Scholar, a recognition given each year to 161 high school seniors nationally for their accomplishments.

Accreditation
Catlin Gabel is accredited by the Northwest Association of Independent Schools (NWAIS).

Student Competition Activities

Catlin Gabel has a long history of science research competition success. Over the years, many students have placed highly in competitions such as the Intel Science Talent Search, the Siemens Competition, the Davidson Fellows Scholarship, and the Intel International Science and Engineering Fair. As of 2020, school review website Niche ranks Catlin Gabel as the number one overall private high school and number one best high school for STEM in the state of Oregon. 

Since 2005, Catlin Gabel has operated a team called "The Flaming Chickens". The team competed in the FIRST Robotics Competition and qualified for the FIRST Championships Competition every year since its inception almost every year. In 2020, Tiffany Toh, a member of “The Flaming Chickens”, was named one of ten Dean's List winners at the FIRST Robotics World award ceremony out of more than 90,000 students.
 
A team of five Catlin Gabel students won the 2019 BPA Regional Science Bowl out of 114 regional teams, a win that sent them to the Department of Energy National Science Bowl in Washington, D.C. later that same year. Student Avi Gupta was also recognized individually as an all star.
 
Catlin Gabel has been a successful participant in the Oregon Mock Trial competition, and has often gone to the national competition.
 
Since the founding of its chess club, Gabel's Varsity Chess Team has taken 1st in the Oregon High School Chess Team Association Championships three years in a row.

Athletics 
Catlin Gabel Eagles is one of the most successful small-school athletic programs in Oregon, having claimed 78 state championships since 1974. The Upper School competes in soccer, cross-country, basketball, baseball, track, golf, swimming, skiing, women's volleyball, and tennis. The school also offers a robust Middle School athletics program.

Catlin Gabel's traditional athletic rival is Oregon Episcopal School, which is also based in Portland. 

Catlin Gabel School competes as a member of the Lewis & Clark League, which comprises public and private high schools in the Portland metropolitan area, and operates under the supervision of the Oregon Schools Activities Association (OSAA). With around 300 students in grades 9-12, the school was classified by the OSAA for the 2022–23 school year as Class 3A school for most athletic competition purposes, which included schools with an enrollment of 146 to 310 students in that grade range.

Girls Soccer
Girls Soccer is the most successful athletic program at Catlin Gabel. The Eagles girls soccer team have won 15 state titles (1992, '94, '95, '96, '97, '98, '99, 2000, '01, '02, '03, '04, '10, '19, '21), tied for the most of any girls soccer program in the state.  

In total, the Eagles have appeared in 22 girls soccer state tournament finals. Girls soccer also won the unofficial 3A title during the COVID-shortened season in 2021, when the OSAA decided not to sponsor state tournaments but athletic directors in different sports organized a series of season-ended culminating events across classifications.

Boys Soccer
Catlin Gabel Boys Soccer program have made 20 appearances in the state championship game and claimed a share of 14 state championships (1988, 1989, 1990, 1991, 1992, 1994, 1995, 2002, 2004, 2010, 2016, 2018, 2019, 2021), which are the 2nd most in Oregon high school state history.

Cross Country 
Catlin Gabel's cross country boys & girls cross-country programs have combined for 10 Oregon state championships, with Girls cross-country team having the distinction of winning the school's first state championship in any sport in 1974. Since then the girls team has claimed 7 more championships (2018, 2016, 2010, 2006, 2005, 2004, 1975), while boys cross country won 3A/2A/1A state titles in 2006 & 2014.

Track & Field 
Track & Field squads have combined for 10 state championships (7 girls, 3 boys) with the boys winning their most recent 3A championship in 2022, the last girls state title came in 2010.

Swimming
The varsity swim teams began in 2013, despite Catlin Gabel's lack of a natatorium. Boys swimming has won three 4A/3A/2A/1A state titles, winning their first in 2015 with just 4 swimmers. Girls swimming claimed their first-ever state championship in 2023.

Tennis
Boys Tennis won the school's 13th state tennis championship in 2022, while the Girls program also claimed their sixth state title that year.  Boys Head Varsity Tennis Coach Hedy Jackson is the only tennis coach in Oregon state history to lead both boys & girls programs to a state championship. She has the most state titles of any Oregon head coach with 14 (12 boys, 2 girls) in 26 seasons as head coach.

Catlin Gabel's indoor tennis courts were the first indoor tennis courts built west of the Mississippi River. In 1951, Catlin Gabel partnered with a group of local tennis enthusiasts  to build an combination indoor court/gymnasium on campus in 1960. A second court was built in 1966, and both are still in active use.

Sustainability 
All grades include an aspect of environmental and social sustainability.
Grades one through five student projects include a worm farm and seedling starts for the campus garden. Middle school students research studies on topics including obesity, agribusiness, the global food supply-chain and the carbon footprint of food. The Upper school's PLACE Program (Planning and Leadership Across City Environments) uses urban planning to study sustainability.

Since 2007, the school has instituted food services programs such as switching to washable dinnerware in the cafeteria and sourcing food from local farms within 150 miles radius.
Within one year the school reduced its landfill contributions by 32.49 tons, and in 2016, after realizing that their recycled plastic was making its way to landfills, two students convinced the school to stop selling bottled water.
In 2020, students and community partners removed 25 truckloads of invasive species from 2.5 acres of school property and planted over 2,000 native shrubs and trees.

School traditions 
Some of the early traditions at Catlin Gabel School included the beginning-of-the-year “Bacon Bat” picnic. Bacon Bat is an event involving games, competitions and a cookout with the intention of building school spirit.

The first “Clean-Up Day” took place in 1937, and the school has continued that tradition since. Though the name of this tradition has been renamed to Campus Day, the central idea of taking care of the school's campus is still at the heart of it.

Additionally, in 1931 students first performed “St. George and the Dragon,” a tradition which continues to take place today. 

One of the most common traditions has been the recitation of the School Chapter, a tradition dating back to 1935 for ninth graders to memorize I Corinthians 13 in their English 9 classes.

The school's Annual Rummage Sale began during World War II and ran for 65 years, with the first event raising over $8,000. The event grew so large it was eventually moved to the Portland Expo Center. The last event was held in 2009.

Faculty sexual assault and misconduct allegations
Beginning in 2017, several former students began writing about sexual abuse by faculty on social media. Coinciding with the Me Too movement, the number of accounts increased, prompting the school to commission an investigation in October 2019.

The investigation issued a report on November 11, 2019. It found that at least 21 Catlin Gabel faculty had taken advantage of their positions at the school in committing various degrees of sexual impropriety. This ranged from the rape of a 6th grade minor to generally inappropriate behavior and relationships between faculty and students that went back as early as the 1960s and was recorded occurring as recently as 2016. In December 2019, the Washington County Sheriff's Department opened a criminal investigation of the school. In January 2020, The Oregonian documented allegations by over 15 former students from age 21 to 61. Six more former students sued the school in April 2020 saying they were fondled, groped, and sexually abused by former teachers Richardson Shoemaker, Robert Ashe, Art Leo and Sam Crawley. A total of 16 former students have filed suit against Catlin Gabel.

Notable alumni
 Megan Amram, 2006, comedian and writer
 David Bragdon, 1977, former president of Metro (regional government)
 Caroline Burke, 1933, actress, theater producer, and art collector
John H. Chun, 1987, federal judge
 Gretchen Corbett, 1963, actress
 Winslow Corbett, 1998, film and stage actress
 Kevin M. Esvelt, 2000, biologist at the MIT Media Lab
 Roger Gantz, 1989, Portland Timbers midfielder
 Max Handelman, 1991, film producer and author
 Margaux Hemingway, 1973, model and actress, granddaughter of novelist Ernest Hemingway
 Mayo Methot, 1919, actress and second wife of Humphrey Bogart
 Sadako Ogata, 1946, former United Nations high commissioner for refugees
 Nadya Okamoto, 2016, founder of PERIOD.org, author of Period Power: a Manifesto for the Menstrual Movement, former Chief Brand Officer of JUV Consulting, founder of August.
Nancy Neighbor Russell, 1944, conservationist and founder of Friends of the Columbia Gorge
 David Shipley, 1981, deputy editorial page editor and op-ed editor, The New York Times
 Olaniyi Sobomehin, 2003, NFL football player
 J. Mary Taylor, 1948, science educator
 Gus Van Sant, 1971, film director
 Charis Wilson, 1932, writer, model for, and wife of photographer Edward Weston

References

External links
 
 Charity Navigator data on Catlin Gabel School

1957 establishments in Oregon
Education in Portland, Oregon
Educational institutions established in 1957
High schools in Washington County, Oregon
Private elementary schools in Oregon
Private middle schools in Oregon
Private high schools in Oregon
Schools accredited by the Northwest Accreditation Commission
West Haven-Sylvan, Oregon